China Venture Capital and Private Equity Association (CVCA) is a Venture Capital industry trade group that itself says "promotes the interest and the development of venture capital ("VC") and private equity ("PE") industry in the Greater China Region."

CVCA was founded in mid-2002 and is based in Beijing.

Members
As of 2008, CVCA has more than 150 member firms, which altogether manage over  US$100 billion in venture capital and private equity funds. CVCA's member firms have experience in PE and VC investing worldwide and have made many investments in a variety of industries in China, including IT, telecoms, business services, media and entertainment, biotech, consumer products, general manufacturing and others.

Mission
CVCA's mission is:

Funding
Funding for CVCA comes from membership payment. Membership for CVCA is open to all China-focused VC and PE firms and corporate investors, and is also open to the related professional companies, which can join as CVCA associate members.

See also
Hedge fund industry in China

References

External links
 

Finance in China
Venture capital